Askja is an active volcano situated in a remote part of the central highlands of Iceland.

Location
The region is only accessible for a few months of the year.  Being situated in the rain shadow to the northeast of the Vatnajökull glacier, the area receives only about 450 mm of rainfall annually.

NASA
The area was used by NASA during training for the Apollo program to prepare astronauts for the lunar missions. Their main objective in Askja was to study geology. The Astronaut Monument in Húsavík lists the 32 astronauts who participated.

Eruptions
Askja was virtually unknown until the subplinian eruption which started on March 28, 1875, followed by the devastating phreatoplinian explosion on March 29, 1875. Especially in the Eastfjords of Iceland, the ashfall was heavy enough to poison the land and kill livestock. Ash, or tephra from this eruption was wind-blown to Norway, Sweden, Germany and Poland. The eruption triggered a substantial wave of emigration from Iceland. Another less well-known eruption, called Askja-S, occurred in the early Holocene, ca 11,000 years ago. Tephra from this eruption has been found in south-east Sweden, Northern Ireland and north Norway and recently as far south as Romania, which makes it one of the most far-travelled Icelandic tephras. The last eruption of Askja was in 1961.

The outer caldera of Askja, representing a prehistoric eruption, is about 50 km², and there is evidence of other later caldera-forming events within it.  The main crater floor lies at about 1,100 m.

In June 2010, Volcano expert Hazel Rymer said seismic activity was increasing at Askja. The increased earthquake activity was located to the northeast of the central volcano, in the direction of Herðubreið. It was ruled out that any activity from Eyjafjallajökull was responsible for the increase in activity at Askja. The news came as scientists continue to watch Katla. In early April 2012 it was noted that the lake in the caldera was totally clear of ice, which usually does not happen until in June or July in a normal year. It was believed that increased geothermal activity in the volcano is heating the lake. Travel in the area was restricted until further research could be carried out.

In early September 2021, GPS and Satellite data showed that an inflation at the rate of five cm per month, most likely attributed to magma intrusion, of the caldera had started in August. An Article published on September 9th from the Icelandic Meteorological Office(IMO) stated the Aviation Color Code was upgraded from "Green" to "Yellow" due to the changes. The Article also says, "Next week IMO and the Institute of Earth Sciences (UÍ) will potentiate the monitoring network around Askja to allow a better coverage and surveillance of the volcano."

Öskjuvatn lake
Öskjuvatn is a large lake that fills much of the smaller caldera resulting from the 1875 eruption.  Its surface lies about 50 m below the level of the main caldera floor and covers about 12 km².  When the lake originally formed it was warm, but today it is frozen over for most of the year.  Öskjuvatn is the second deepest lake in Iceland at 220 m deep.

Missing scientists
In 1907, the German scientists Walter von Knebel and Max Rudloff visited Askja to study the caldera.  While exploring Öskjuvatn in a small boat, they disappeared without a trace. Von Knebel's fiancée Ina von Grumbkow led an expedition to search for them, but no indication of what happened to them was ever found. Recent observations on the effects of a landslide, on 21 July 2014, has led to renewed speculation that the scientists were killed by a similar sudden event, a massive wave similar to the one estimated to be 30 meters high seen in 2014.

Sights and tourism in the area

The Dyngjufjöll mountains which surround the Askja caldera, also contain the Drekagil , the canyon of dragons. Within 25km and 40km of Askja, are two other volcanic systems: Herðubreið and Kverkfjöll.

Askja is a popular tourist destination. There are two mountain huts and a campsite at Dreki , by Drekagil, which is about 100 km by a 4x4 F-road, from the Icelandic ring-road. The road continues 8 km up from Dreki into the Askja caldera. It is a walk of about 2.5 km from the car park to Öskjuvatn and Víti . The roads are usually only open for about three to four months, from late June until early October.

See also
 Geography of Iceland
 Iceland plume
 List of glaciers of Iceland
 List of lakes of Iceland
 List of rivers of Iceland
 List of volcanic eruptions in Iceland
 List of volcanoes in Iceland
 Volcanism of Iceland

References

External links
 Askja in the Catalogue of Icelandic Volcanoes

Photos and videos

 Panoramic views of Iceland, including Askja
 Askja & Víti 2004 – 2010. Picture Gallery from islandsmyndir.is
  Photo of Víti Crater

Scientific papers
 Earthice, Univ. of Iceland, description of Askja
 Askja, Global Volcanism Program, Smithsonian Institution
 Asta R. Hjartadóttir (2008): The fissure swarm of the Askja central volcano, Univ. of Iceland (PDF)
 Rymer, Hazel: The case of the shrinking volcano, 19.11.2009 (Blogpost of the geophysicist)
 UP60q3hTuL0bQFayjWySe2pbcHXPDZorubx8kmqCf_1h8qfhNK96ufjwrE1OtY0T5jRPfGrBVxChdVBHFtgfgBfthdw5YCWuUAC2x89gg1TGjBR_hf8-1GoQtO&sig=AHIEtbTVxfbK9oIgvpHCLi7O2Yv8YudG7Q A. Key, e.a.: Crustal seismicity beneath Askja volcano reflecting plate tectonics and melt movement. (Zur Erdbebentätigkeit an der Askja) (PDF, 31 KB)
 Rymer, H., C. Locke, B. G. Ófeigsson, P. Einarsson, and E. Sturkell (2010): New mass increase beneath Askja volcano, Iceland – a precursor to renewed activity? Terra Nova, 22, 309–313.  
 Sigurdur Thorarinsson, and G. E. Sigvaldason: The eruption in Askja 1961, a preliminary report. American Journal of Science, Vol. 260, November 1962, P.641-651;   (Abstract)
  Eysteinn Tryggvason: Ground deformation in Askja, Iceland: its source and possible relation to flow of the mantle plume, Journal of Volcanology and Geothermal Research, 39 (1989) 61–71 61 (PDF)
  Erik Sturkell, Freysteinn Sigmundsson: Continuous deflation of the Askja caldera, Iceland, during the 1983–1998 noneruptive period, JOURNAL OF GEOPHYSICAL RESEARCH, VOL. 105, NO. B11, PP. 25,671–25,684, 2000;   (PDF)
  Heidi Soosalu, Janet Key, Robert S. White, Clare Knox, Páll Einarsson und Steinunn S. Jakobsdóttir: Lower-crustal earthquakes caused by magma movement beneath Askja volcano on the north Iceland rift, Bulletin of Volcanology, Vol. 72, no. 1, 55–62;   (Springer-Link, Abstract)
 Heidi Soosalu, e.a.: Askja 2007 – Scientific Project. (PDF)
  Rymer, Hazel and Tryggvason, Eysteinn (1993): Gravity and elevation changes at Askja, Iceland. Bulletin of Volcanology, 55(5), pp. 362–371. (PDF)

Highlands of Iceland
Mountains of Iceland
Stratovolcanoes of Iceland
Active volcanoes
VEI-5 volcanoes
Volcanic crater lakes
North Volcanic Zone of Iceland
19th-century volcanic events
One-thousanders of Iceland
Volcanic systems of Iceland
Calderas of Iceland
Central volcanoes of Iceland